The Minolta MAXXUM 7000 (7000 AF in Europe and α-7000 in Japan) 35 mm SLR camera was introduced in February 1985. It was the first camera to feature both integrated autofocus (AF) and motorised film advance, the standard configuration for later amateur and professional single lens reflex cameras.

Overview
Although the Nikon F3AF (1983), Pentax ME F and Chinon CE-5 already had presented autofocus single lens reflex cameras, autofocusing could not be achieved without the use of special motorised AF lenses. The Pentax ME F had focus sensors in the camera body, while the Chinon CE-5 used a lens with built-in active infrared sensors. Nikon already had a camera with integrated motor drive on the market, the N2000 (F-301 in UK), but its autofocus counterpart, the N2020 (F-501 in UK), appeared after the Maxxum/Dynax.

The Minolta 7000 had its AF sensors and the focusing drive inside the camera body, and as a result the lenses could be much smaller and cheaper.  The aperture and focus were mechanically driven through the lens mount from the camera body.  However, electronically controlled buttons on the camera body now replaced the mechanical aperture ring on the lens, and the setting was electronically displayed on the body and in the viewfinder.  The metal housing of older Minolta SLR cameras was replaced with a lighter, cheaper body made of plastics.  In other respects, the Maxxum offered most of the standard features of other cameras of the day, with the exception of a rather low flash sync speed (1/125 sec.) and no multi-exposure capability.

Minolta introduced a new lens mount, the A system, breaking compatibility with its earlier manual-focus lenses in the MC and MD system. The A lens mount is still the same today, but some modifications have been made to the electronic contacts to facilitate new functions such as motor zoom (xi lenses, now discontinued) and a more sophisticated flash metering system (ADI).

Konica and Minolta merged their photo and camera businesses in October 2003. In January 2006 Konica Minolta announced that they were withdrawing from the camera and photo business, transferring their assets to Sony, who since have continued development of the A system through their Alpha series.

Autofocus

When Pentax and Nikon entered the autofocus segment, both used a similar passive array AF system as Minolta, but retained compatibility with their existing manual-focus K and F mounts respectively. Canon, like Minolta, chose to change its mount completely, introducing the EOS 600-series a few years later, breaking compatibility with the former FL and FD lens mounts. Canon's EOS system was the only fully electronic lens mount system, with no mechanical connections between camera body and lens: the autofocus motors were housed in the lens itself, rather than the camera body.

Legal troubles

Early Maxxum 7000 cameras were inscribed "MAXXUM 7000" with a crossed 'XX'. The oil giant Exxon considered this to be a violation of its trademark, because the XX in its logo was linked in a similar fashion. As a result, Minolta was allowed to distribute cameras that were already produced, but was forced to change the stylistic XX in Maxxum and implement this change in new production. All Maxxum cameras produced thereafter had a regularly scripted double 'X'.

Minolta's autofocus design was found to infringe the patents of Honeywell, a U.S. corporation. After protracted litigation, Minolta in 1991 was ordered to pay Honeywell damages, penalties, trial costs and other expenses in a final amount of $127.6 million.

References

External links
Maxxum 7000 at MIR

135 film cameras
7000